Frank or Francis Briggs may refer to:

Francis Stewart Briggs (1897–1966), Australian aviator
Frank Briggs (footballer) (1917–1984), English soccer player
Frank A. Briggs (1858–1898), American governor of the state of North Dakota
Frank O. Briggs (1851–1913), U.S. senator from New Jersey
Frank P. Briggs (1894–1992), U.S. senator from Missouri

See also
Briggs (surname)